Natalie Ann García Méndez (born 30 January 1990) is an American-born Mexican retired footballer who played as a defender. She has been a member the Mexico women's national team.

College career
García attended the University of San Diego in San Diego, California.

International career
García represented Mexico at the 2010 FIFA U-20 Women's World Cup. She capped at senior level during the 2010 CONCACAF Women's World Cup Qualifying, the 2011 FIFA Women's World Cup and the 2012 CONCACAF Women's Olympic Qualifying Tournament.

Personal life
García received her Master's in Professional Nursing at the University of Arizona. She currently resides in San Diego, California where she is currently practicing as a registered nurse (RN).

See also 
 List of Mexico women's international footballers

References

1990 births
Living people
Citizens of Mexico through descent
Mexican women's footballers
Women's association football defenders
Mexico women's international footballers
2011 FIFA Women's World Cup players
People from Valley Center, California
Sportspeople from San Diego County, California
Soccer players from California
American women's soccer players
San Diego Toreros women's soccer players
American sportspeople of Mexican descent